= Δ7-Prednisolone =

Chemical compound

Δ^{7}-Prednisolone

Clinical data
- Other names: 7-Dehydroprednisolone; 11β,17α,21-Trihydroxypregna-1,4,7-triene-3,20-dione
- Drug class: Corticosteroid; Glucocorticoid

Identifiers
- CAS Number: 28421-52-5

Chemical and physical data
- Formula: C_{21}H_{25}O_{5}
- Molar mass: 357.426 g·mol^{−1}
- 3D model (JSmol): Interactive image
- SMILES: O([H])[C@@](C(CO[H])=O)1CC[C@]([H])2C3=CCC4=CC(C=C[C@]4(C)[C@@]3([H])[C@](C[C@@]21C)O[H])=O
- InChI: InChI=1S/C21H25O5/c1-19-7-5-13(23)9-12(19)3-4-14-15-6-8-21(26,17(25)11-22)20(15,2)10-16(24)18(14)19/h4-5,7,9,15,18,22,24,26H,3,6,8,10-11H2,1-2H3/t15-,18+,19-,20-,21-/m0/s1; Key:SPXFKCJVBZRZNP-YSCIFQABSA-N

Δ^{7}-Prednisolone, or 7-dehydroprednisolone, is a synthetic glucocorticoid corticosteroid which was never marketed.
